{{DISPLAYTITLE:C15H21NO2}}
The molecular formula C15H21NO2 may refer to:

 Ciclafrine
 Ciclonicate
 Ethylphenidate
 Eucaine
 Indenolol
 Ketobemidone
 4-Methylmethylphenidate
 MPPP
 Pethidine
 Prodilidine
 Methoxetamine